Thackley A.F.C. are a football club based in Thackley, north Bradford, West Yorkshire, England. Their home ground is the ‘Thank You Key Workers Stadium at Dennyfield’ and the primary colours of club are red and white.

History

Thackley FC was formed in 1930, spending much of their early years in local football before joining the West Riding County Amateur League in 1939. The club then moved into county-wide leagues, spending 25 years in the West Riding County Amateur League, winning that league on five occasions before a brief spell in the West Yorkshire League. Thackley then joined the Yorkshire League before becoming founder members of the Northern Counties East League's Premier Division where they have been ever since with the club's best season being in 1993–94 when they were runners-up, losing out on goal difference to Stocksbridge Park Steels. The club has never been relegated from that division throughout the League's 40-year history.

Thackley's best efforts in national cup competitions have been in the FA Vase, their best season being in 1980–81 when they got to the fifth round. The club has never progressed beyond the second qualifying round of either the FA Cup or the FA Trophy.

Honours

Northern Counties East Football League Cup
 Winners 2011–12, 2012–13
Yorkshire League
 Division 2 Champions 1973–74
West Yorkshire League
 Winners 1965–66 1966–67
West Riding County Amateur League
 Winners 5 times
West Riding County Cup
 Winners 1973–74 1974–75
West Riding County Challenge Cup
 Winners 1963–64, 1966–67
'''Bradford & District Senior Cup
 Winners 13 times.

Ground

References

External links
 Club Website
 NCEL Website

Football clubs in England
Sport in Bradford
Football clubs in West Yorkshire
1930 establishments in England
Association football clubs established in 1930
West Riding County Amateur Football League
West Yorkshire Association Football League
Yorkshire Football League
Northern Counties East Football League